Terminal Storage Mini Hydro is the name of an electricity generator operating in the supply pipes for Adelaide's water supply in South Australia. The facility is installed at Tea Tree Gully and uses a stainless steel turbine in the gravity-powered supply pipes. It was developed by SA Water who own and operate the water distribution with experience from Hydro Tasmania. It has been upgraded to now provide .

Hydro Tasmania and SA Water are equal partners in the joint venture which opened in October 2003. In 2011–12, it generated  of electricity.

References

Power stations in South Australia